Yoshihisa Yoshikawa (吉川 貴久, September 4, 1936 – October 12, 2019) was a Japanese shooter. He competed at the 1960, 1964, 1968 and 1972 Olympics  in the 50 m pistol event and won bronze medals in 1960 and 1964.

References

1936 births
2019 deaths
Japanese male sport shooters
ISSF pistol shooters
Olympic shooters of Japan
Shooters at the 1960 Summer Olympics
Shooters at the 1964 Summer Olympics
Shooters at the 1968 Summer Olympics
Shooters at the 1972 Summer Olympics
Olympic bronze medalists for Japan
Olympic medalists in shooting
Asian Games medalists in shooting
Asian Games gold medalists for Japan
Medalists at the 1962 Asian Games
Medalists at the 1966 Asian Games
Medalists at the 1970 Asian Games
Shooters at the 1962 Asian Games
Shooters at the 1966 Asian Games
Shooters at the 1970 Asian Games
Medalists at the 1960 Summer Olympics
Medalists at the 1964 Summer Olympics
20th-century Japanese people